Gabriel de Guilléstegui, O.F.M.  (1594–1677) was a Roman Catholic prelate who served as Bishop of La Paz (1670–1677) and Bishop of Paraguay (1666–1670).

Biography
Gabriel de Guilléstegui was born in Toledo, Spain in 1594 and ordained a priest in the Order of Friars Minor.
On 15 December 1666, he was appointed during the papacy of Pope Alexander VII as Bishop of Paraguay.
In 1667, he was consecrated bishop by Bernardo de Izaguirre de los Reyes, Bishop of Cuzco. 
On 1 September 1670, he was appointed during the papacy of Pope Clement X as Bishop of La Paz.
He served as Bishop of La Paz' until his death in 1677.

While bishop, he was the principal consecrator of Francisco de Borja, Bishop of Córdoba (1671).

References

External links and additional sources
 (for Chronology of Bishops) 
 (for Chronology of Bishops)  
 (for Chronology of Bishops) 
 (for Chronology of Bishops) 

17th-century Roman Catholic bishops in Bolivia
Bishops appointed by Pope Alexander VII
Bishops appointed by Pope Clement X
1594 births
1677 deaths
People from Toledo, Spain
Franciscan bishops
17th-century Roman Catholic bishops in Paraguay
Roman Catholic bishops of Paraguay
Roman Catholic bishops of La Paz